The Adrian R-III School District is a public school district in Bates County, Missouri, United States, based in Adrian, Missouri.

Schools
The Adrian R-III School District has one elementary school and one middle school/high school.

Adrian Elementary School 
Serves Grades PK-5

Adrian Jr./Sr. High School 
Serves Grades 6-12

References

External links
https://web.archive.org/web/20120305212315/http://www.adrian.k12.mo.us/index.html

Education in Bates County, Missouri
School districts in Missouri